New Hampshire's 10th State Senate district is one of 24 districts in the New Hampshire Senate. It has  been represented by Democrat Donovan Fenton since 2022.

Geography
District 10 covers most of Cheshire County in the far southwestern corner of the state, including the towns of Alstead, Chesterfield, Gilsum, Harrisville, Hinsdale, Keene, Marlborough, Nelson, Roxbury, Sullivan, Surry, Swanzey, Walpole, Westmoreland, and Winchester.

The district is located entirely within New Hampshire's 2nd congressional district. It borders the states of Massachusetts and Vermont.

Recent election results

2022

Elections prior to 2022 were held under different district lines.

Historical election results

2020

2018

2016

2014

2012

Federal and statewide results in District 10

References

10
Cheshire County, New Hampshire